Chris Barton may refer to:

 Chris Barton (cyclist) (born 1988), American cyclist
 Chris Barton (actor) (born 1987), English actor and singer 
 Chris Barton (ice hockey) (born 1987), Canadian ice hockey player
 Christopher Barton (1927–2013), Irish rower who competed in the 1948 Summer Olympics